Noughts and Crosses was an Australian television game show which aired live on Sundays from 1957 to 1960 on Melbourne station HSV-7. The half-hour series was hosted by Geoff Raymond, though Danny Webb hosted four episodes in 1960. Archival status of this game show is unknown.

Gameplay
The format was described in the 2 July 1959 issue of The Age: "Contestants are asked to choose subjects on which they are asked questions. Their answers provide the moves to the noughts and crosses board."

References

External links
 

Seven Network original programming
1957 Australian television series debuts
1960 Australian television series endings
1950s Australian game shows
1960s Australian game shows
Australian live television series
Black-and-white Australian television shows
English-language television shows